Big Desert is a locality in the Australian state of Victoria located in the state's west adjoining the border with South Australia within the local government areas of the Shire of Hindmarsh, the Rural City of Mildura and the Shire of West Wimmera.  The principal land use is conservation with part of the locality being occupied by the following protected areas:
Big Desert Wilderness Park 
 Wyperfeld National Park.

See also
Little Desert, Victoria

References

Towns in Victoria (Australia)